Nicolas Bøgild (born 23 February 1988) is a Danish football player. He plays for Valur.

Now playing for FC Firkloeveren struggling to make the first team behind Mogens Jensen, Alexander Caroe and Jon Hoffmann

Club career
He made his Danish Superliga debut for Randers on 14 March 2010 in a game against Nordsjælland.

References

External links
 

1988 births
Living people
Danish men's footballers
Randers FC players
Skive IK players
Vendsyssel FF players
Valur (men's football) players
Danish Superliga players
Danish 1st Division players
Úrvalsdeild karla (football) players
Danish expatriate men's footballers
Expatriate footballers in Iceland
Association football forwards